Bruce Turgon (born April 25, 1952) is an American bass guitarist, guitarist, vocalist, songwriter and producer. Bruce has played in several bands throughout his career including: Foreigner, The Lou Gramm Band, Shadow King, Steve Stevens, Warrior, Black Sheep and Showcase.

Biography
Turgon was born and raised in North Chili, New York, a suburb of Rochester, and near the hometown of future bandmate and singer Lou Gramm.  Turgon began playing as a multi-instrumentalist in elementary school. In high school, he joined the Rochester-based cover band Showcase, competing in the same market as the Gramm-fronted band Poor Heart. Turgon and Gramm started the band Black Sheep in late 1971, which built a strong regional following over the next two years. The Gramm-Turgon EP Stick Around,  which led the group to be signed to Capitol, was released on Chrysalis in 1974. The band released two albums in 1974, and was poised for continued success when a highway accident in 1975 damaged their equipment, causing them to lose the support-act-slot for Kiss that year. Turgon left New York for Los Angeles, eventually writing, recording and touring with Billy Thorpe, Nick Gilder, Prism and Warrior, in addition to performing around the Los Angeles area with his own bands. Turgon co-wrote the song "My Way" along with Paul Stanley and Desmond Child for the platinum Kiss album Crazy Nights in 1987.

The Lou Gramm Band
Turgon's long association with his friend Gramm led to writing and recording Gramm’s first solo album Ready or Not, which yielded the hit single "Midnight Blue". Ready or Not charted at number 27 in the United States. The single "Midnight Blue" was number one on the Hot Mainstream Rock Tracks. A second solo album: Long Hard Look was released, yielding the top ten hit "Just Between You and Me," and "True Blue Love," which reached the Top 40. Turgon also contributed a song to the soundtrack for the horror film The Lost Boys (1987) entitled "Lost in the Shadows."  Gramm attempted to rejuvenate his solo career in 2003 with a band that included Turgon on bass, Rocket Richotte on guitar, Kevin Neal on drums, John Purdell on keyboards (who suddenly died very early during the tour), and Gary Corbett on keyboards. This initial lineup chose to take different paths following the death of Gramm's mother and father.

Steve Stevens Atomic Playboys
In between recording of Gramm’s second album Long Hard Look and its subsequent tour, Turgon toured with Steve Stevens in support of his solo album Atomic Playboys (1989). The touring band featured Steve Stevens on guitar, Perry McCarty on vocals (formerly in Warrior with Turgon), Gregg Gerson on drums, Phil Ashley on keyboards, and Turgon on bass guitar. Atomic Playboys was Steve Stevens first solo recording and yielded the music video "Atomic Playboys" with Turgon on bass.

Shadow King
Turgon and Gramm formed the short-lived band Shadow King in 1991 along with guitarist Vivian Campbell (Dio, Whitesnake, Riverdogs and Def Leppard) and drummer Kevin Valentine (Godz, The Lou Gramm Band, Kiss, and Neverland.) They released a self-titled album and contributed a song ("One Dream") to the film Highlander II: The Quickening (starring Sean Connery and Christopher Lambert). Turgon co-wrote nine of the ten tracks on the debut album, and handled multiple instruments, arrangements and programming duties. The video "I Want You" received some play on MTV. Although plans were made for a tour, they performed only once, at the Astoria Theatre in London, England, on December 13, 1991. Vivian Campbell announced shortly afterward that he was leaving Shadow King to join Def Leppard. Although replacements were considered, the band members eventually went their separate ways. Lou Gramm performed the Bad Company classic "Can't Get Enough" on stage with former bandmate Vivian Campbell and Def Leppard when their tour made a stop in Gramm's hometown of Rochester, New York.

Foreigner era
When Gramm rejoined Foreigner in 1992, Turgon was hired to play bass in place of the departing Rick Wills. Three new songs were recorded for the compilation The Very Best ... and Beyond: "Soul Doctor", "Prisoner of Love" and "With Heaven on Our Side." Foreigner then released their eighth studio album Mr. Moonlight in 1995, with several songs co-written by Turgon, including the single "Until the End of Time." Several tours followed, returning Foreigner to the classic rock spotlight, and once again proving the band to be a successful touring act.

Projects and solo efforts
Turgon has become increasingly involved in television, movie and documentary soundtrack work over the last ten years, contributing to shows on HBO, Showtime, PBS, and Warren Miller Films. Turgon released his first solo album in 2005, entitled Outside Looking In.  The album features the tracks "Living a Lie," "Any Other Time," and the title track "Outside Looking In" featuring Ronnie Montrose on lead guitar and  ex-Montrose member Denny Carmassi on drums. Turgon worked on a collaboration album with Redding, California-based electronic musician Craig Padilla, titled Places of Power. The CD Now Is the Hour was released on January 23, 2009 on the Blistering Records label and featured former Endless Summer Beach Band member Philip Bardowell on lead vocals.

Discography

Black Sheep
Stick Around EP (1974)
Black Sheep (1974)
Encouraging Words (1975)

Warrior
Fighting For The Earth (1985)

Lou Gramm
Ready or Not (1987)
The Lost Boys (film soundtrack; contributed one song, "Lost In The Shadows") (1987)
Long Hard Look (1989)

Shadow King
Shadow King (1991)
Highlander II: The Quickening (film soundtrack; contributed one song, "One Dream") (1991)

Foreigner
Mr. Moonlight (1994)

Bruce Turgon
Outside Looking In (2005)

Places of Power
Now Is The Hour (2009)

Ronnie Montrose
 10x10 ("One Good Reason") (2017)

External links
 Bruce Turgon interview with MelodicRock.com

Foreigner (band) members
Black Sheep (rock band) members
1952 births
Shadow King members
Living people
American rock bass guitarists
American male bass guitarists
Songwriters from New York (state)
People from Chili, New York
Guitarists from New York (state)
American male guitarists
Warrior (band) members